Alcidodes porosus is a species of beetles belonging to the true weevil family. It is found in Indonesia.

References

 Encyclopedia of Life
 Global names index
 Zipcodezoo Species Identifier

Alcidinae
Beetles described in 1894
Insects of Asia